General elections were held in Bermuda on 9 November 1998. The result was a victory for the Progressive Labour Party, which won 26 of the 40 seats in the House of Assembly.

Results

References

Elections in Bermuda
Bermuda
General election
Bermuda
November 1998 events in North America
Election and referendum articles with incomplete results